Johnstown is a ghost town in McPherson County, Kansas, United States.

History
Johnstown had a post office from the 1880s until 1904.

Education
The community is served by Smoky Valley USD 400 public school district.

References

Further reading

External links
 McPherson County maps: Current, Historic, KDOT

Unincorporated communities in McPherson County, Kansas
Unincorporated communities in Kansas
1880s establishments in Kansas